Naseriyeh (also Romanized as Nāşerīyeh; also known as Nāşerīyeh-e Kaffeh) is a village in Sharifabad Rural District, in the Central District of Sirjan County, Kerman Province, Iran. At the 2006 census, its population was 41, in 10 families.

References 

Populated places in Sirjan County